Sivert Hanssen-Sunde (1842 – ??) was a Norwegian politician.

He was elected to the Parliament of Norway in 1895, representing the urban constituency of Flekkefjord. He worked as a merchant there. He sat through only one term. He was mayor of Flekkefjord from 1894 to 1899.

References

1842 births
Year of death missing
Members of the Storting
Mayors of places in Vest-Agder
Norwegian merchants
People from Flekkefjord
19th-century Norwegian businesspeople